Duke Cheng of Qin (died 660 BC) was from 663 to 660 BC the thirteenth ruler of the Zhou Dynasty state of Qin that eventually united China to become the Qin Dynasty.  His ancestral name was Ying, and Duke Cheng was his posthumous title.

Duke Cheng was the second of the three sons of his father Duke De of Qin.  His older brother Duke Xuan of Qin succeeded his father as ruler of Qin in 676 BC.  But when Duke Xuan died in 664 BC, he passed the throne to Duke Cheng instead of one of his nine sons.  When Duke Cheng died four years later, he did the same and passed the throne to the third brother Duke Mu of Qin, even though he had seven sons.

References

Year of birth unknown
Rulers of Qin
7th-century BC Chinese monarchs
660 BC deaths